A total solar eclipse occurred on March 18, 1988. A solar eclipse occurs when the Moon passes between Earth and the Sun, thereby totally or partly obscuring the image of the Sun for a viewer on Earth. A total solar eclipse occurs when the Moon's apparent diameter is larger than the Sun's, blocking all direct sunlight, turning day into darkness. Totality occurs in a narrow path across Earth's surface, with the partial solar eclipse visible over a surrounding region thousands of kilometres wide. Totality was visible in Indonesia and southern Philippines.

Observation 
The General Santos City Tourism Office of the Philippines promoted it as a big tourism event. Hordes of scientists, astronomers, journalists, TV crews and tourists from all over the globe observed the totality from there. Then president of the Philippines and the first female president in Asia, Corazon Aquino also joined the experience.

Related eclipses

Eclipses of 1988 
 A penumbral lunar eclipse on March 3.
 A total solar eclipse on March 18.
 A partial lunar eclipse on August 27.
 An annular solar eclipse on September 11.

Solar eclipses of 1986–1989

Saros 139

Inex series

Metonic series

References

External links

 Foto Solar eclipse of March 18, 1988

Photos:
 The 1988 Eclipse in The Philippines

1988 03 18
1988 in science
1988 03 18
March 1988 events
1988 in Indonesia
1988 in the Philippines